Brian Battistone and Dann Battistone were the defending champions. They were not compete this year.
3rd seeds Raven Klaasen and Izak van der Merwe won in the final 4–6, 7–6(7–2), [10–4], against 1st seeds Ryler DeHeart and Pierre-Ludovic Duclos.

Seeds

Draw

Draw

External links
 Doubles Draw
 Qualifying Doubles Draw

JSM Challenger of Champaign-Urbana - Doubles
JSM Challenger of Champaign–Urbana